Héctor López (born 17 September 1971) is a Spanish former volleyball player who competed in the 1992 Summer Olympics.

References

1971 births
Living people
Spanish men's volleyball players
Olympic volleyball players of Spain
Volleyball players at the 1992 Summer Olympics
Sportspeople from Santa Cruz de Tenerife